Shadow Man is a studio album from South African artist Johnny Clegg and his band Savuka.

It was released in 1988 and produced by Hilton Rosenthal. South Africa's apartheid was still in place, and some of the songs contained heavy political messages aimed at the regime. The lyrics were mainly sung in English, with backing vocals in Zulu. All were written by Johnny Clegg with the exception of tracks 7 and 8, for which Keith Hutchinson collaborated. The album twice reached #31 in Canada - first on September 3rd, 1988, and again on October 1st.
The single "I Call Your Name" reached #78 in Canada, August 27, 1988.

Track listing
 "Human Rainbow" – 4:24
 "Talk to the People" – 3:58
 "Too Early for the Sky" – 4:23
 "I Call Your Name" – 4:01
 "Take My Heart Away" – 4:15
 "The Waiting" – 4:59
 "African Shadow Man" – 4:28
 "Dance Across the Centuries" – 3:53
 "Joey Don't Do It" – 3:29
 "Siyayilanda" – 4:14

Personnel
Johnny Clegg – vocals, guitar, concertina, mouth bow
Solly Letwaba – bass guitar, vocals
Derek de Beer – drums, percussion, vocals
Keith Hutchinson – keyboards, flute, saxophone, vocals
Steve Mavuso – keyboards, vocals
Dudu Zulu – percussion, vocals

Additional personnel
Bobby Summerfield– mixer, recording engineer, keyboards & drum programing.

Additional musicians
Mandisa Dlanga – backing vocals
Deborah Fraser – backing vocals
Marilyn Nokwe – backing vocals
Beaulah Hashe – backing vocals

References

Savuka albums
1988 albums
Capitol Records albums